Leucopogon apiculatus is a species of flowering plant in the family Ericaceae and is endemic to the south of Western Australia. It is an erect shrub with oblong to elliptic leaves and pink to white tube-shaped flowers.

Description
Flowering occurs from July to November.

Taxonomy
Leucopogon apiculatus was first formally described in 1810 by Robert Brown in Prodromus Florae Novae Hollandiae et Insulae Van Diemen. The specific epithet (apiculatus) means "abruptly ending in a small point", referring to the leaves.

Distribution and habitat
This leucopogon grows in sandy or stony soils on granite outcrops, hills and rocky slopes in near-coastal areas of southern Western Australia, from Cape Le Grand National Park in the west to Cape Arid National Park in the east, including on the islands of the Recherche Archipelago, in the Esperance Plains and Mallee bioregions of southern Western Australia.

Conservation status
Leucopogon apiculatus is listed as "Priority Three" by the Government of Western Australia Department of Biodiversity, Conservation and Attractions, meaning that it is poorly known and known from only a few locations but is not under imminent threat.

References

apiculatus
Ericales of Australia
Flora of Western Australia
Plants described in 1810
Taxa named by Robert Brown (botanist, born 1773)